Christian VII (29 January 1749 – 13 March 1808) was a monarch of the House of Oldenburg who was King of Denmark–Norway and Duke of Schleswig and Holstein from 1766 until his death in 1808. For his motto he chose: "Gloria ex amore patriae" ("Glory through love of the fatherland").

Christian VII's reign was marked by mental illness and for most of his reign, Christian was only nominally king. His royal advisers changed depending on who won power struggles around the throne. From 1770 to 1772, his court physician Johann Friedrich Struensee was the de facto ruler of the country and introduced progressive reforms signed into law by Christian VII. Struensee was deposed by a coup in 1772, after which the country was ruled by Christian's stepmother, Juliane Marie of Brunswick-Wolfenbüttel, his half-brother Frederick, and the Danish politician Ove Høegh-Guldberg. From 1784 until Christian VII's death in 1808, Christian's son, later Frederick VI, acted as unofficial regent.

Early life

Birth and family

Christian was the son of King Frederick V and his first wife Louise of Great Britain. He was born in the Queen's Bedchamber at Christiansborg Palace, the royal residence in Copenhagen. He was baptized a few hours later the same day. His godparents were King Frederick V (his father), Queen Dowager Sophie Magdalene (his paternal grandmother), Princess Louise (his aunt) and Princess Charlotte Amalie (his grand-aunt).

A former heir to the throne, also named Christian, had died in infancy in 1747, and the newborn was thus crown prince from birth; therefore, hopes were high for the future of the new heir apparent. Christoph Willibald Gluck, then conductor of the royal opera troupe, composed the opera La Contesa dei Numi ("The Contention of the Gods"), in which the Olympian Gods gather at the banks of the Great Belt and discuss who in particular should protect the new prince.

At birth, Christian had two elder sisters, Princess Sophia Magdalena and Princess Wilhelmina Caroline, and the family was joined by another daughter, Princess Louise in 1750. In 1751, almost three years after Christian's birth, his mother Queen Louise died during her sixth pregnancy, just aged 27 years. The following year, his father married Duchess Juliana Maria of Brunswick-Wolfenbüttel, who gave birth to Christian's half-brother, Prince Frederick in 1753.

Childhood and education

After the early death of his mother, the prince was largely denied parental affection. His stepmother Queen Juliane Marie showed no interest in him, preferring her biological son Prince Frederick. Prone to debauchery and increasingly affected by alcoholism, the father himself became increasingly indifferent to the shy, sensitive child, who was also prone to epileptic seizures. Nonetheless, early historians state that Christian had a winning personality and considerable talent, but that he was poorly educated and systematically terrorized, and even flogged, by a brutal tutor, Christian Ditlev Frederik Reventlow, the Count of Reventlow. He seems to have been intelligent and had periods of clarity, but had severe emotional problems, possibly schizophrenia, as argued by Doctor Viggo Christiansen in Christian VII's mental illness (1906).

Early reign

Accession

After a long period of infirmity, Frederick V died on 14 January 1766, just 42 years old. At the death of his father, Christian immediately ascended the thrones of Denmark and Norway as their sixth absolute monarch, a few weeks before his 17th birthday. Later the same day, Christian was proclaimed king from the balcony of Christiansborg Palace. Christian's reign was marked by mental illness which affected government decisions, and for most of his reign, Christian was only nominally king. His court physicians were especially worried by his frequent masturbation. His royal advisers changed depending on who won power struggles around the throne.

Marriage

Later the same year, the young king married his first cousin, the just 15-year-old Princess Caroline Matilda of Great Britain, in a dynastic marriage. They had been betrothed already in 1765. Her brother, King George III of Great Britain, was anxious about the marriage but not aware that the bridegroom was mentally ill. They were married in a proxy wedding ceremony on 1 October 1766 in the Chapel Royal of St James's Palace in London, with the Princess's brother, Prince Edward, Duke of York and Albany, acting as the representative of the groom. After her arrival in Copenhagen, another wedding ceremony took place on 8 November 1766 in the royal chapel at Christiansborg Palace. Marriage celebrations and balls lasted for another month. On 1 May 1767, Christian VII and Caroline Matilda were crowned King and Queen of Denmark and Norway in the royal chapel of Christiansborg Palace.

The marriage was unhappy, and after his marriage, the king abandoned himself to the worst excesses, especially sexual promiscuity. In 1767, he entered into a relationship with the courtesan Støvlet-Cathrine. He ultimately sank into a condition of mental stupor. Symptoms during this time included paranoia, self-mutilation, and hallucinations. The king showed little interest in the queen and only reluctantly visited her in her chambers. Reverdil had to step in, among other things with love letters written in the king's name, in an attempt to make the marriage lead to a pregnancy and thus an heir to the throne. On 28 January 1768, Queen Caroline Mathilde gave birth at Christiansborg Palace to the royal couple's probably only child, a son and heir to throne, the future King Frederick VI.

Struensee

The progressive and radical thinker Johann Friedrich Struensee, Christian's personal physician, became his advisor and rose steadily in power in the late 1760s to de facto regent of the country, where he introduced widespread progressive reforms. Struensee was a protégé of an Enlightenment circle of aristocrats that had been rejected by the court in Copenhagen. He was a skilled doctor, and having somewhat restored the king's health while visiting the Schleswig-Holstein area, he gained the king's affection. He was retained as travelling physician (Livmedikus hos Kong Christian VII) on 5 April 1768, and accompanied the entourage on the king's foreign tour to Paris and London via Hannover from 6 May 1768 to 12 January 1769. He was given the title of State Councilor (etatsråd) on 12 May 1768, barely a week after leaving Altona. The neglected and lonely Caroline Matilda entered into an affair with Struensee.

From 1770 to 1772, Struensee was de facto regent of the country, and introduced progressive reforms signed into law by Christian VII. Struensee was deposed by a coup in 1772 after which the country was ruled by Christian's stepmother, Juliane Marie of Brunswick-Wolfenbüttel, his half-brother Frederick, and the Danish politician Ove Høegh-Guldberg.

Divorce
The king divorced Caroline Matilda in 1772 after they had produced two children: the future King Frederick VI and Princess Louise Auguste. Struensee, who had enacted many modernising and emancipating reforms, was arrested and executed the same year. Christian signed Struensee's arrest and execution warrant under pressure from his stepmother, Queen Juliana Maria, who had led the movement to have the marriage ended. Caroline Matilda, retaining her title but not her children. She eventually left Denmark and passed her remaining days in exile at Celle Castle in her brother's German territory, the Electorate of Hanover. She died there of scarlet fever on 10 May 1775 at the age of 23.

Later life

Christian was only nominally king from 1772 onward. Between 1772 and 1784, Denmark-Norway was ruled by his stepmother, the Queen Dowager Juliane Marie, his half-brother Frederick, and the Danish politician Ove Høegh-Guldberg. From 1784, his son Frederick VI ruled permanently as prince regent. This regency was marked by liberal, judicial, and agricultural reforms, but also by disasters of the Theatre War, French Revolutionary Wars, and the beginning of the Napoleonic Wars, also at the same time the Norwegian separatist movement was on the rise.

Death and succession

Christian died at age 59 of a stroke on 13 March 1808 in Rendsburg, Schleswig. Although there were rumours that the stroke was caused by fright at the sight of Spanish auxiliary troops which he took to be hostile. Ulrik Langen, in his biography of the king, did not indicate that there was any external cause. He was buried in Roskilde Cathedral and was succeeded by his son Frederick VI.

Legacy

Contribution to science
In 1769, Christian VII of Denmark invited the Hungarian astronomer Miksa Hell (Maximilian Hell) to Vardø. Hell observed the transit of Venus, and his calculations gave the most precise calculation of the Earth–Sun distance to that date (approx. 151 million kilometres). Hell's companion János Sajnovics explored the affinity among the languages of the Sami, Finnish, and Hungarian peoples (all members of the Finno-Ugric language family).

Cultural depictions

Christian VII, the story of his marriage, and his wife's affair with Struensee has featured in many artistic works:

Literature

 1935 : Die Gefangene von Celle – a 1935 novel by Else von Hollander-Lossow
 1935 : The Favourite of the Queen (later Der Favorit der Königin) – a 1935 novel by Robert Neumann
 1948 : The Queen's Physician – a 1948 novel by Edgar Maass
 1953 : Converse at Night in Copenhagen – a 1953 novel by Karen Blixen
 1955 : Caroline Matilda, princess of Great Britain and queen of Denmark – a 1955 novel by Geoffrey Vaughan Blackstone
 1969 : The Lost Queen – a 1969 novel by Norah Lofts
 1985 : Letter from Celle – a 1985 dramatic poem by Edward Lowbury
 1999 : The Visit of the Royal Physician – a 1999 novel by Per Olov Enquist
 2000 : Prinsesse af Blodet - en roman om Caroline Mathilde – a 2000 novel by Bodil Steensen-Leth
 2015 : There's a mad king in Denmark – a 2015 biographical novel by Dario Fo

Stage
 1827 : Struensee – an 1827 drama by Michael Beer with stage music by his brother Giacomo Meyerbeer (Stuttgart and Tübingen: Cotta 1829, premiered in Munich in 1828). The play was originally forbidden under the rule of the Prussian King Frederick William III, and finally allowed by his more liberal successor Frederick William IV and premiered in Berlin in 1856.
 1991 : Caroline Mathilde – a 1991 two-act ballet staged by the Royal Danish Ballet and choreographed by Flemming Flindt to music by Sir Peter Maxwell Davies.
 2008 : The Visit of the Royal Physician – a 2008 opera staged by the Royal Danish Opera and composed by Bo Holten to a libretto based on Enquist's 1999 novel.

Film
 1923 : The Love of a Queen – a 1923 German historical drama silent film directed by Ludwig Wolff, in which Christian VII is played by Walter Janssen.
 1935 : The Dictator – a 1935 British film directed by Victor Saville, in which Christian VII was played by Emlyn Williams. The film depicts his relationship with Caroline Mathilde, who is played by Madeleine Carroll.
 1957 : King in Shadow – a 1957 West German feature film based on Neumann's 1935 novel, and directed by Harald Braun, in which Christian VII was played by Horst Buchholz.
 - a 2010 Danish film
 2012 : A Royal Affair – an Academy Award-nominated Danish historical drama film directed by Nikolaj Arcel, in which King Christian is played by Mikkel Boe Følsgaard.

Ancestry

References

Citations

Bibliography
 Reddaway, W. F. "King Christian VII," English Historical Review (1916) 31#121 pp. 59–84 IN jstor
Sjåvik, Jan  (2010) The A to Z of Norway	 (Scarecrow Press)

In Danish
 
 
Christiansen, Viggo. Christian den VII's sindssygdom. Odense Universitetsforlag, 1978
Dehn-Nielsen, Henning. Christian 7. Den gale konge. Sesam, Copenhagen, 2000
Den Store Danske encyclopedia. Danmarks Nationalleksikon/Gyldendal, Copenhagen, 1996
 
Enquist, Per Olov. Livläkarens besök. Norstedts Förlag, Stockholm, 1999
Fjelstrup, August. Skilsmisseprocessen imellem Kong Kristian den syvende og Dronning Karoline Matilde.' Strubes Forlag, 1968.
Hansen, Norman Hall. Caroline Mathilde. Ejnar Munksgaards Forlag, Copenhagen 1947
Holm, Sven. Struensee var her. Danmarks Radio, Copenhagen, 1981
Laing R. D. og Esterson A.:]z; Familieliv. Rhodos, Copenhagen 1974
 
Lauring, Palle. Historiske Portrætter. Aschehoug Dansk Forlag, Copenhagen 1960
Reverdil, Elie Salomon François. Struensee og det danske hof 1760-1772. A. F. Høst & Søn Forlag, Copenhagen 1917Salmonsens Konversations Leksikon, Schultz, Copenhagen, 1926
Steenstrup, Joh. et al. (Ed). Danmarks Riges historie.'' Det Nordiske Forlag, Copenhagen

Primary sources

External links

 The Royal Lineage at the website of the Danish Monarchy
 Christian VII at the website of the Royal Danish Collection at Rosenborg Castle
 
 

|-

 
1749 births
1808 deaths
18th-century monarchs of Denmark
19th-century monarchs of Denmark
18th-century Norwegian monarchs
19th-century Norwegian monarchs
Burials at Roskilde Cathedral
Denmark–Norway
Dukes of Holstein
Dukes of Schleswig
Children of Frederick V of Denmark